Bryde Island is a hypsographic island in the Queen Maud Gulf within the Kitikmeot Region of Nunavut, Canada.

Uninhabited islands of Kitikmeot Region